Fire Talker is a 2009 documentary film by Australian filmmaker Ivan Sen.  It is a documentary biopic about Aboriginal Australian political activist, footballer and administrator, Charlie Perkins. It premiered at the 10th Anniversary of the Message Sticks Indigenous Film Festival held at the Sydney Opera House in May 2009. This festival was curated by Perkins' daughter Rachel.

References

2009 films
Australian documentary films
Biographical documentary films
Australian independent films
Documentary films about Aboriginal Australians
2009 documentary films
Documentary films about association football
Australian biographical films
2009 independent films
Films directed by Ivan Sen
2000s English-language films